Abacetus testaceipes is a species of ground beetle in the subfamily Pterostichinae. It was described by Victor Motschulsky in 1864.

References

testaceipes
Beetles described in 1864